Garhi Qamardin or Garhi Qamar Din, is located in the neighbourhood of Peshawar, Pakistan. This township, previously a village, is located at the juncture of Ring Road, Peshawar and Kohat Road, Peshawar. A flyover was built in 1990s at this juncture, called Garhi Qamardin Flyover, but in Oct,2015 the flyover called Rahman BaBa flyover, today a main part of the major bus routes of Peshawar. The national highway N55 starts at this location downward  joining the Indus Highway which go till Karachi, the most southern city of Pakistan.

History
Garhi Qamardin was a small village under the big Deh-Bahadur/Bahadar Kalay. The village came into being when the residence of Bahadar Kalay (which means 'Village Bahadur') settled in their farmland in the presently Garhi Qamardin. The native residents were mostly the descendants of the families closely related to the famous sufi poet Rahman Baba of Pushto. However, presently the township includes people from several ethnic groups.

Geographical location
Garhi Qamardin is located in the south of Peshawar city. It is nearby to the Small Industries Estate (SIE), Peshawar and the Government College of Technology Peshawar. It is located at the juncture of Ring Road, Peshawar and Kohat Road, Peshawar. The Ring Road, Peshawar is one of the important route used for NATO supply, which resulted in increased terror attacks in this area near to this juncture of Ring Road and Kohat Road.

References

Populated places in Peshawar District